Motta di Livenza (or  di Ligenda/ Ligondo·la/ Livanda·la, later Ligondza, then Livenza) is a town in the province of Treviso, Veneto, Italy.

Twin towns
Motta di Livenza is twinned with:

  L'Isle-Jourdain, Gers, France
  Cres, Croatia
  Parakou, Benin

References

Cities and towns in Veneto